Charles William Butterfield (January 14, 1917 – March 18, 1988) was an American jazz bandleader, trumpeter, flugelhornist, and cornetist.

Early years
Charles William Butterfield was born in Middletown, Ohio and attended high school in Wyoming. Although he studied medicine at Transylvania College, he preferred playing in bands, and he studied cornet with Frank Simon. He discontinued his studies after finding success as a trumpeter.

Career
Early in his career he played in the band of Austin Wylie. He gained attention working with Bob Crosby (1937–1940), and later performed with Artie Shaw, Les Brown, and Benny Goodman.

While with Bob Crosby, he initially played third trumpet behind Charlie Spivak and Yank Lawson.  When those two left Crosby to join Tommy Dorsey's band in 1938, Butterfield was given the opportunity to solo on a song written by Crosby bassist Bob Haggart, initially titled "I'm Free."  When lyrics were added, it became the well-known standard "What's New?".

On October 7, 1940, during his brief stay with Artie Shaw's orchestra, Butterfield performed what has been described as a "legendary trumpet solo" on the hit song "Star Dust". He was also a featured soloist in the small group from Shaw's band, the Gramercy Five. Between 1943 and 1947, taking a break to serve in the United States armed forces, Butterfield led his own orchestra. On September 20, 1944, Capitol recorded the jazz standard "Moonlight In Vermont", which featured a vocal by Margaret Whiting and trumpet solos (both open and muted) by Butterfield.  The liner notes from the CD Capitol from the Vaults, Volume 2, "Vine Street Divas" indicate that, although Billy Butterfield & His Orchestra were credited with the song, it was really the Les Brown band recording under the name of Billy Butterfield, because Brown was under contract to another label at the time.

Butterfield recorded two albums with arranger-conductor Ray Conniff, Conniff Meets Butterfield, (1959) and Just Kiddin' Around (1962). Later in the 1960s he recorded two albums with his own orchestra for Columbia Records.

The trumpeter was a member of the World's Greatest Jazz Band, led by former Crosby bandmates Yank Lawson and Bob Haggart, from the late 1960s until his death in 1988. He also freelanced as a guest star with many bands all over the world, and performed at many jazz festivals, including the Manassas Jazz Festival and Dick Gibson's Bash in Colorado.

Film
Butterfield was seen in the film Second Chorus (1940) as a member of an orchestra led by Artie Shaw.

Personal life
Butterfield was married to singer Dotty Dare Smith.

Death
Butterfield died on March 18, 1988, in North Palm Beach, Florida. He was 71.

Discography
 Stardusting (Capitol, 1950)
 Billy Butterfield (1955)
 New York Land Dixie (1955)
 They're Playing Our Song (RCA, 1956)
 Session at Riverside (Capitol, 1957)
 Conniff Meets Butterfield (with Ray Conniff; Columbia, 1959)
 I'm In The Mood (Belldisc Italiana, 1959)
 Billy Blows His Horn (Columbia, 1961)
 The Golden Horn (Columbia, 1962)
 Just Kiddin' Around (with Ray Conniff; Columbia, 1963)
 Songs Bix Beiderbecke Played (Epic, 1969)
 With Ted Easton's Jazzband (Circle, 1975)
 Watch What Happens (Jazzology, 1977)
 Swinging at the Elks (Fat Cat Jazz, 1978)
 You Can Depend on Me (Fat Cat Jazz, 1980)
 Just Friends (Jazzology, 1982)
 The Incomparable Butterfield Horn (Fat Cat Jazz, 2002)
 Recipe for Romance (Collectors' Choice Music, 2003)
 Soft Strut (Fresh Sound, 2004)
 What Is There to Say (Jasmine, 2005)

With Buck Clayton
All the Cats Join In (Columbia, 1956)

References

External links
Jazz trumpet transcriptions
[ All Music]
Billy Butterfield Interview NAMM Oral History Library (1985)
 Billy Butterfield recordings at the Discography of American Historical Recordings

1917 births
1988 deaths
Big band bandleaders
Dixieland trumpeters
Traditional pop musicians
Swing trumpeters
American jazz trumpeters
American male trumpeters
RCA Victor artists
20th-century American musicians
20th-century trumpeters
People from Middletown, Ohio
People from North Palm Beach, Florida
Jazz musicians from Ohio
20th-century American male musicians
American male jazz musicians
World's Greatest Jazz Band members
Jazzology Records artists
Columbia Records artists
Capitol Records artists